Franklin is a city and the county seat of Robertson County, Texas, United States. It is within the Brazos Valley on the cusp of East and Central Texas. As of the 2020 census, the city population was 1,614.

Geography 

Franklin lies near the geographic center of the county, on an upland prairie that is drained by the branches of three creeks. Touchstone Branch, to the north, runs westward into Mud Creek; South Mineral Creek drains waters eastward to the Navasota River; and the forks of Cedar Creek run to the south, passing Mount Pleasant, Henry Prairie and Wheelock.

Franklin is located at  (31.026222, –96.486086).

On April 13, 2019, an EF-3 tornado went through Franklin causing widespread damage and many injuries.

Demographics

Franklin is part of the Bryan-College Station metropolitan area.

As of the 2020 United States census, there were 1,614 people, 555 households, and 419 families residing in the city.

As of the census of 2000, there were 1,470 people, 533 households, and 351 families living in the city. The population density was 1,594.4 people per square mile (616.9/km). There were 626 housing units at an average density of 679.0 per square mile (262.7/km). The racial makeup of the city was 75.51% White, 19.52% African American, 0.20% Native American, 0.41% Asian, 0.07% Pacific Islander, 2.93% from other races, and 1.36% from two or more races. Hispanic or Latino of any race were 8.84% of the population.

There were 533 households, out of which 36.8% had children under the age of 18 living with them, 44.5% were married couples living together, 17.8% had a female householder with no husband present, and 34.0% were non-families. 30.8% of all households were made up of individuals, and 18.2% had someone living alone who was 65 years of age or older. The average household size was 2.53 and the average family size was 3.20.

In the city, the population was spread out, with 29.0% under the age of 18, 6.9% from 18 to 24, 25.0% from 25 to 44, 18.4% from 45 to 64, and 20.6% who were 65 years of age or older. The median age was 37 years. For every 100 females, there were 85.4 males. For every 100 females age 18 and over, there were 80.6 males.

The median income for a household in the city was $27,400, and the median income for a family was $33,889. Males had a median income of $31,818 versus $20,441 for females. The per capita income for the city was $13,490. About 15.4% of families and 18.9% of the population were below the poverty line, including 23.5% of those under age 18 and 25.0% of those age 65 or over.

Notable attractions 

 Pridgeon Community Center and Visitor Center
 Robertson County Courthouse – National Register of Historic Places
 Franklin Ranch – Community/Sports Park
 Franklin Carnegie Library
 Franklin Cemetery

Government 
Franklin is a Type A general law city governed by a mayor and five city council members. The mayor and city council are elected at large to serve for a two-year term. Members may serve an unlimited number of terms. The city council meets on the third Monday of each month at 6:00 pm at City Hall. Request to be placed on the agenda should be made to the city secretary and approved by the mayor. All members must be residents within the city limits of Franklin.

Education 

Franklin is served by the Franklin Independent School District. The district website is located at Franklin ISD. It consists of three schools:
 Roland Reynolds Elementary: Pre-K–4th
 Franklin Middle School: 5th–8th
 Franklin High School: 9th–12th
The school district has approximately 1100 students and is classified as 3A according to the University Interscholastic League (UIL). Franklin High School has approximately 300–350 students.

Notable people 
 Fred C. Cole, librarian and historian

Images

References

External links
 

Cities in Texas
Cities in Robertson County, Texas
County seats in Texas
Bryan–College Station